The Ice Hockey Association of Bosnia and Herzegovina (HSBiH) (Bosnian, Croatian and Serbian: Hokejaški savez Bosne i Hercegovine; Хокејашки савез Босне и Херцеговине) is the governing body of ice hockey in Bosnia and Herzegovina. It is responsible for the Bosnia and Herzegovina Hockey League (BHL) and the Bosnia and Herzegovina men's national ice hockey team.

References

External links
Official website
Bosnia and Herzegovia at IIHF.com

Ice hockey in Bosnia and Herzegovina
Ice hockey governing bodies in Europe
International Ice Hockey Federation members
Ice hockey
Sports organizations established in 2001
2001 establishments in Bosnia and Herzegovina